Alex Martin Jon Battle (born 23 January 1999) is an English professional footballer who plays as a forward for Tavistock. Battle previously appeared in the Football League for Plymouth Argyle and Crawley Town.

Early life
Battle was born in Plymouth.

Career

Plymouth Argyle
On 9 November 2017 Battle joined Southern Football League side Salisbury on a youth loan, but had his loan cut short when he was forced to return to Argyle just a month later for treatment on a knee injury that he sustained during a 4–3 defeat to Larkhall Athletic. Battle made his EFL League One debut for Argyle as a substitute in a 5–2 defeat away to Gillingham on 5 May 2018, the last day of the 2017–18 season. Battle was sent on in the 79th minute for Jamaican international Joel Grant. Battle was one of five academy players on the bench for Argyle that game, alongside Cameron Sangster, Klaidi Lolos, Ryan Law and Dan Rooney.

On 17 July 2018, it was reported that Battle had turned down an offer of an extended contract from Argyle, and was training with Bolton Wanderers, a club he had trained with previously. However, with Bolton already in a dispute with their current players over unpaid wages, the Trotters were unable to agree a youth compensation fee with Argyle. On 23 July 2018 it was reported that Battle had agreed a professional contract with Plymouth Argyle.

Truro City
On 4 January 2019, Battle joined National League South side Truro City on loan until the end of the season, joining up with Jordan Bentley and Dan Rooney, two fellow Argyle loanees. He was released by Plymouth Argyle at the end of the 2018–19 season. In September 2019, he joined Truro City on a permanent deal. In May 2020, his contract at the club was extended for the 2020–21 season.

Crawley Town
On 4 September 2021, Battle signed for EFL League Two club Crawley Town on a one-year deal with the option for a further year following a trial at the club. He made his debut for the club later that day as a substitute in a 1–0 defeat away to Bristol Rovers. On 3 December 2021, Battle joined Isthmian League South East Division side East Grinstead Town on a 28-day loan deal. His loan was later extended to 29 January. On 1 February 2022, Battle rejoined former club Truro City on loan for the remainder of the 2021–22 season.

Career statistics

References

External links

Profile on Truro City website

1999 births
Living people
English footballers
Footballers from Plymouth, Devon
Footballers from Devon
Association football forwards
Plymouth Argyle F.C. players
Salisbury F.C. players
Truro City F.C. players
Crawley Town F.C. players
English Football League players
National League (English football) players
Southern Football League players
East Grinstead Town F.C. players
Isthmian League players